Pneumatoarthrus is an extinct genus of sea turtle known from the Late Cretaceous (early Maastrichtian) Mount Laurel Formation of Monmouth County, New Jersey. Only a single species, P. peloreus, is known.

Taxonomy
The holotype of Pneumatoarthrus, ANSP 9225, was originally identified as a sacrum belonging to Hadrosaurus by Joseph Leidy in an 1865 monograph on Cretaceous reptiles from the US. Edward Drinker Cope later identified it belonging to a dinosaur more closely related to Anchisaurus, Efraasia, and Clepsysaurus than to Dryptosaurus and Ornithopsis, and in his 1872 description of the sea turtle Protostega he decided that Pneumatoarthrus was likely a sea turtle as well, which he reiterated in his 1875 monograph on Cretaceous vertebrate fossils from the Western Interior. Later authors overlooked Cope's 1875 monograph and considered it either a theropod or a hadrosaur (Huene 1932 considered Pneumatoarthrus the sacral vertebrae of Dryptosaurus). Baird (1979) confirmed the protostegid identification of Pneumatoarthrus by Cope (1872, 1875) based on examination of ANSP 9225.

References

Protostegidae
Cretaceous turtles of North America
Prehistoric turtle genera
Taxa named by Edward Drinker Cope
Extinct turtles